Canton is a surname. Notable people with the surname include:

Bruce Dal Canton, American baseball player
Frank M. Canton, American gunslinger (not his real name)
Gloria Begué Cantón (1931–2016), Spanish professor, jurist, senator and magistrate
Joanna Canton, American actress
John Canton, English physicist
Mark Canton, American film executive and producer
Neil Canton, American film producer
William Canton, British writer
Yediel Canton, Spanish figure skater